The 2007 Masters (officially the 2007 SAGA Insurance Masters) was a professional non-ranking snooker tournament that took place from 14 to 21 January 2007 at the Wembley Arena in London, England. It was the 33rd edition of the tournament. In a slight change for 2007, there were 19 competitors, as opposed to 18 up until 2006. The top 16 seeds for ranking events were automatically invited, while the other players entered a qualifying tournament for the right to one of three wild-card places. The two remaining places were granted by the game's governing body at their discretion to Jimmy White and Ding Junhui. Stuart Bingham won the qualifying tournament.

Ronnie O'Sullivan won his third Masters title by defeating Ding Junhui 10–3 in the final. With a noticeably partisan crowd, a visibly upset Ding went to shake O'Sullivan's hand after the latter won the 12th frame to go 9–3 in front, apparently believing that the match was over. The two walked arm-in-arm out of the arena. After O'Sullivan clinched the match in the following frame, it later transpired that Ding had indeed believed the match was best-of-17 frames.

Field
Defending champion John Higgins was the number 1 seed with World Champion Graeme Dott seeded 2. Places were allocated to the top 16 players in the world rankings. Players seeded 14, 15 and 16 played in the wild-card round against the winner of the qualifying event, Stuart Bingham (ranked 24), and two wild-card selections, Ding Junhui (ranked 27) and Jimmy White (ranked 34). This was the only time that there were three matches in the wild-card round. Barry Hawkins was making his debut in the Masters.

Prize fund
The breakdown of prize money for this year is shown below:

Qualifying stage
Winner: £2,000
Runner-up: £680
Semi-final: £250
Quarter-final: £105
Total: £3,600

Televised stage

Winner: £130,000
Runner-up: £62,000
Semi-final: £32,000
Quarter-final: £16,000
Last 16: £12,000
Last 18 (seeded): £12,000
Last 18 (wild-cards): £2,000

Highest break: £10,000
Maximum break: £25,000

Wild-card round

In the preliminary "wild-card round", the three wild-card players were drawn against the players seeded 14th, 15th and 16th: During the course of his match against Anthony Hamilton, Ding Junhui became the 28th and youngest ever player to score a maximum 147 break on live television. Aged , he broke the previous record set by Ronnie O'Sullivan in 1997 who was then  old. This was also just the second maximum in the history of the Masters.

Main draw

Final

Qualifying
The 2006 Masters Qualifying Event were held between 4 and 9 November 2006 at the English Institute of Sport in Sheffield, England. The winner of this series of matches, who qualified for the tournament, was Stuart Bingham.

Century breaks

Televised stage centuries
Total: 26

 147, 128, 109, 108, 105, 105, 104  Ding Junhui
 143, 130, 128, 117, 116, 115, 106, 101  Ronnie O'Sullivan
 129  Stephen Hendry
 127  Ken Doherty
 126, 102  Neil Robertson

 116  Stephen Maguire
 105, 103, 103  Matthew Stevens
 103  Anthony Hamilton
 103  Ali Carter
 100  Stephen Lee

Qualifying stage centuries 

 137, 124, 103  Marco Fu
 137  Michael Holt
 131  Dene O'Kane
 129, 112  Barry Pinches
 127, 123, 121, 116, 114, 106  Mark Selby
 118, 110, 104, 102  Stuart Bingham
 118  Mark King

 116  Joe Perry
 105, 104  David Gray
 104  Jeff Cundy
 104  Judd Trump
 103  Liang Wenbo
 102  Michael Judge
 100  Ian McCulloch

References

2007
Masters
Masters (snooker)
Masters (snooker)